Portage Township is one of thirteen townships in St. Joseph County, in the U.S. state of Indiana. As of the 2000 census, its population was 94,916.

Geography

Cities, towns, villages
 South Bend (partial)

Census Designated Places
 Notre Dame (Partial)

Unincorporated towns
 Ardmore at 
(This list is based on USGS data and may include former settlements.)

Adjacent townships
 Clay Township (northeast)
 Penn Township (east)
 Centre Township (south)
 Greene Township (southwest)
 Warren Township (west)
 German Township (northwest)

Cemeteries
The township contains these five cemeteries: Bowman, Cedar Grove, Hungarian Sacred Heart, Riverview and Saint Josephs.

Major highways

Airports and landing strips
 Esther Landing Pad Airport
 South Bend Regional Airport (partial)

Lakes
 Pinhook Lake
 St. Joseph Lake
 St. Mary's Lake

Landmarks
 [[Holy Cross College (Indiana) https://www.hcc-nd.edu/
 Saint Mary's College (south three-quarters) https://www.saintmarys.edu/
 University of Notre Dame (partial) https://www.nd.edu/
 Indiana University South Bend https://www.iusb.edu/
 Ivy Tech Community College South Bend https://www.ivytech.edu/southbendelkhart/index.html

School districts
 South Bend Community School Corporation

Political districts
 Indiana's 2nd congressional district
 State House District 6
 State House District 7
 State House District 8
 State Senate District 10
 State Senate District 11
 State Senate District 8
 State Senate District 9

References
 United States Census Bureau 2008 TIGER/Line Shapefiles
 United States Board on Geographic Names (GNIS)
 IndianaMap

External links
 Indiana Township Association
 United Township Association of Indiana

Townships in St. Joseph County, Indiana
South Bend – Mishawaka metropolitan area
Townships in Indiana